Castleton is an unincorporated community in Reno County, Kansas, United States.  It is located northeast of Pretty Prairie between Castleton Road and North Fork Ninnescah River.

History
Castleton was a station and shipping point on the Hutchinson & Blackwell division of the Atchison, Topeka and Santa Fe Railway.

The post office was established December 6, 1872, remained in operation until it was discontinued on June 28, 1957.  In 1971, the post office building was moved to the Barton County Historical Society Museum and Village in Great Bend, Kansas.

Education
The community is served by Pretty Prairie USD 311 public school district.  

Castleton High School closed in 1954, the mascot was the Pirates, colors red & blue. Castleton Grade School closed in 1970, most students transferred to Pretty Prairie school district.

In popular culture
Castleton was the setting for "Sevillinois, Illinois 1895" in the movie Wait Till the Sun Shines, Nellie filmed in 1952.

Notable people
 Larry Foss, former MLB with the Pittsburgh Pirates and New York Mets.

References

Further reading

External links
 Reno County maps: Current, Historic, KDOT

Geography of Reno County, Kansas
1872 establishments in Kansas
Populated places established in 1872